Analogue Bubblebath 5 is an unreleased EP by techno and IDM artist Richard David James.

Recorded in 1995, it had been intended for release on James' own label, Rephlex Records, under his alias AFX, as the fifth installment in his Analogue Bubblebath series. The EP would have consisted of nine tracks, in alternating acid house/techno and ambient styles. However, Richard decided that it was not up to par with the others in the series, so only a handful of vinyl test pressings were made.

In January 2005 Rephlex mailed out black vinyl/binder editions of Analord 10. Due to problems at the manufacturing/mail out stage, approximately 20 buyers did not receive their package. Rephlex mailed out a second batch in June 2005 to those who had not received their order. This second batch included a free copy of Analogue Bubblebath 5. This distribution of Analogue Bubblebath 5 was unannounced.

No information is printed on the record's blank white labels (although some copies do have "AB5" written and circled onto them), but the identifying call number of 'CAT 034' has been etched into its run-out grooves. However, there are no plans of a commercial release for this album.

James later uploaded an alternate mix of track 2 on SoundCloud as "21 Hapshifter1".

Track listing

Note: On the Rephlex Records website, the title "Cuckoo" was given to the track that is 6:04, versus its original untitled state.

Personnel 
Richard D. James – synthesizer, producer

References

External links
 Analoge Bubblebath 5 at aphextwin.nu
 AB5 on discogs.com, with pictures
 http://www.sonymusic.co.jp/Music/Info/SonyTechno/feature/9801/disc.htm
 https://web.archive.org/web/20110708071445/http://unheard78.blogspot.com/2009/08/afx-analogue-bubblebath-5.html

Aphex Twin EPs
Unreleased albums